Sajani is a 2004 Indian Bengali-language romantic drama film directed by Swapan Saha and produced by Debendra Kuchar. The film features actors Prosenjit Chatterjee and Rimi Sen in the lead roles. Music of the film has been composed by Ashok Bhadra. The film was a remake of Tamil film Arputham. The film was a 'Hit' upon its release and its soundtrack contains Best Bengali Songs 2000s of all time.

Plot 
Ashok whiles away his time smoking and drinking alcohol, using his father's hard-earned money. He falls in love with Priya, unaware of the fact that she is in love with another man, Rahul.

Cast 
 Prosenjit Chatterjee as Ashok
 Rimi Sen as Priya, Ashok's love interest & Rahul's fiancée
 Jisshu Sengupta as Rahul
 Subhasish Mukhopadhyay as Rana, Ashok's Friend
 Locket Chatterjee as Rimi, Ashok's Sister
 Bodhisattwa Majumdar as Ashok's Father
 Lokesh Ghosh as Gobindo, Mad Guy
 Anuradha Ray as Ashok's Mother
 Kalyani Mondal as Priya's Mother
 Abhik Bhattacharya as Priya's Father

Soundtrack

References 

Bengali-language Indian films
2004 films
Bengali remakes of Tamil films
2000s Bengali-language films
Indian romantic drama films
2004 romantic drama films